Gangadhar Sen Roy (1798 – 1885) was a Bengali Ayurvedic doctor, poet and Sanskrit scholar.

Early life
Sen Roy was born to Bhabani Prasad Sen Roy in 1798 in Magura, the then Jessore District British India. He studied Ayurveda Shastra from Kabiraj Ramakanta Sen in Rajshahi. He went to Kolkata from Magura then came to Saidabad, near Berhampore in 1836 and settled there. He became popular as legendary physician of Murshidabad. He was also the family physician of local zamindars and Nawab family of Murshidabad. He received Kaviraj and Kaviratna title.

Literary works
Sen Roy wrote poems and plays in Sanskrit. His book Jalpakalpataru is a work on ancient Charak Samhita. Sen Roy wrote almost 80 books on Ayurveda, Tantra, Sanskrit Grammar, Astrology and Philosophy. They include:

 Kavyaprava
 Lokalokapurusiya
 Durgobadhkabya
 Rajvijay
 Taravatisayangvara
 Pramadbhavjani
 Mugdhabodhamahavrth
 Taittiriyopanisadvrtti
 Harsadaya
 Tattvavidyakara

References

1798 births
1885 deaths
19th-century Indian medical doctors
Indian medical academics
Bengali writers
Indian Sanskrit scholars
People from Magura District
Bengali Hindus
People from Murshidabad district
Medical doctors from West Bengal
Indian poets
19th-century Indian poets
Indian scholars
19th-century Indian scholars
Sanskrit scholars from Bengal